HSwMS Thordön was the second ship of the  monitors, built for the Royal Swedish Navy in the mid-1860s. She was designed under the supervision of the Swedish-born inventor, John Ericsson, and built in Sweden. Thordön made one foreign visit to Russia in 1867, but remained in Swedish or Norwegian waters (at the time, Sweden and Norway were united in personal union) for the rest of her career. The ship was reconstructed between 1903 and 1905, but generally remained in reserve. She was mobilized during World War I, and sold in 1922 for conversion to a barge.

Design and description
The John Ericsson-class ironclads were designed to meet the need of the Swedish and Norwegian navies for small, shallow-draft armored ships capable of defending their coastal waters. John Ericsson, designer and builder of the Monitor, had been born in Sweden, although he had become an American citizen in 1848, and offered to share his design with the Swedes. In response they sent Lieutenant John Christian d'Ailly to the United States to study monitor design and construction under Ericsson. D'Ailly arrived in July 1862 and toured rolling mills, gun foundries, and visited several different ironclads under construction. He returned to Sweden in 1863 having completed the drawings of a Monitor-type ship under Ericsson's supervision.

John Ericsson was divided into nine main compartments by eight watertight bulkheads. Over time a flying bridge and, later, a full superstructure, was added to each ship between the gun turret and the funnel. Initially her crew numbered 80 officers and men, but this increased to 104 as she was modified with additional weapons.

Propulsion
The John Ericsson-class ships had one twin-cylinder vibrating lever steam engines, designed by Ericsson himself, driving a single four-bladed,  propeller. The ships carried  of coal, enough for six day's steaming.

Armament
Thordön, and her sister ship Tirfing, were briefly armed with a pair of  M/66 smoothbore guns before being rearmed in 1873 with two  M/69 rifled breech loaders, derived from a French design. Thordön received her guns in 1882.

In 1877 each monitor received a pair of 10-barreled  M/75 machine guns designed by Helge Palmcrantz. These guns were replaced during the 1880s by the 4-barreled  M/77 Nordenfeldt gun, which was an enlarged version of Palmcrantz's original design.

Armor
The gun turret's armor consisted of twelve layers of iron, totalling  in thickness on the first four monitors. The inside of the turret was lined with mattresses to catch splinters. The conning tower was positioned on top of the turret and its sides were ten layers thick. The funnel was protected by six layers of armor with a total thickness of  up to half its height.

Service
Thordön had her keel laid down on November 1865 and was launched 1 December 1865. She was commissioned on 14 August 1866. This was the only foreign visit ever made by the ship.

Thordön (later spelled Tordön) was laid up in reserve in 1868 and 1869. She was rearmed with 240-millimeter M/69 guns (serial numbers 5 and 6) in 1872, but was laid up again from 1874 to 1882. The ship ran aground and sank on Lilla Rimö Island, off Norrköping, on 23 July 1883. She was salvaged on 4 August and managed to proceed under her own power to Karlskrona Naval Dockyard for repairs. The subsequent court-martial ordered the ship's captain to pay for the costs of the salvage and repairs, despite a misplaced buoy that caused the ship to ground. She was recommissioned in 1885 and 1888–89 before being placed back in reserve. Tordön was reconstructed in 1903–05; she received a pair of new  Bofors M/94 guns that were given elevation limits of −7° and +15°. The ship also received eight 57-millimeter guns and new boilers. She was reactivated during World War I and assigned to the Gothenburg local defense flotilla in company with her sister Tirfing. Both ships were decommissioned in 1922 and sold the following year. Their new owner converted them into barges and used them in Stockholm harbor.

Footnotes

References
 
 

John Ericsson-class monitors of the Swedish Navy
1865 ships
Ships built in Norrköping